The Venetian Affair  is a 1967 spy film directed by Jerry Thorpe and starring Robert Vaughn and Elke Sommer. It is based on a novel of the same name by Helen MacInnes.

Plot
A former CIA agent, Bill Fenner, now a downbeat, loner journalist, is sent to Venice to investigate the shock suicide bombing by an American diplomat at a peace conference.

CIA chief Frank Rosenfeld specifically requests Fenner come out of retirement because one of the suspects in the case is Fenner's ex-wife, Sandra Fane, who is believed to be a Communist sympathizer. A secret report by Dr. Vaugiroud could be the key, but Fenner's and Fane's lives are greatly endangered, particularly at the hands of a mysterious man named Wahl, while trying to unravel the plot.

Cast
 Robert Vaughn as Bill Fenner
 Elke Sommer as Sandra Fane
 Felicia Farr as Claire Connor
 Boris Karloff as Dr. Pierre Vaugiroud
 Ed Asner as Frank Rosenfeld
 Karl Boehm as Robert Wahl
 Roger C. Carmel as Mike Ballard
 Luciana Paluzzi as Giulia Almeranti

Production
The Venetian Affair was shot on location in Venice, Italy.

Release
The Venetian Affair was released in theatres on January 18, 1967. The film was released on DVD by Warner Archive Collection on October 18, 2011.

Reception
Bosley Crowther of The New York Times wrote in his review: "It's a totally inane and posy picture about an American newspaper photographer who gets involved in an international intrigue in Venice which has something to do with obtaining a secret report. [...] Some nice color photography in Venice is the only plus feature of this film, which is based on a novel by Helen MacInnes."

See also
List of American films of 1967

References

Sources

External links
 

1967 films
American spy thriller films
Films set in Venice
Films shot in Venice
1960s spy thriller films
Metro-Goldwyn-Mayer films
Films based on American novels
Films scored by Lalo Schifrin
Films based on works by Helen MacInnes
Parody films based on James Bond films
1960s English-language films
Films directed by Jerry Thorpe
1960s American films